The Kota Damansara station is a mass rapid transit (MRT) station serving the suburb of Kota Damansara in Petaling Jaya, Selangor, Malaysia. It is one of the stations of the MRT Kajang Line, formerly known as MRT Sungai Buloh-Kajang Line. The station opened on 16 December 2016 as part of phase one operations of the line.

The station is located near the SEGi University Kota Damansara and the Tropicana Medical Centre in Kota Damansara.

Station features

The station adopts the standard design for all elevated stations of the MRT Sungai Buloh-Kajang Line. The station is built above Persiaran Surian with its supporting piers located along the median of the road.

Station location
The station is located above Persiaran Surian near the intersection between that road and Jalan Teknologi in the area known as PJU5 of Kota Damansara.

Well-known landmarks near the station include the Tropicana Medical Centre, SEGi University, Sri KDU School and the Gugusan Melati flats. The Kota Dame (formerly Uptown Kota Damansara) night market can be accessed via feeder bus from this station.

Station layout

Exits and entrances
The station has two entrances - Entrance A and Entrance B - situated on both sides of Persiaran Surian. Entrance B is also accessible from Jalan Camar 4/5 which runs parallel to Persiaran Surian. There are feeder bus stops, taxi lay-bys and also drop-off areas at both entrances along Persiaran Surian.

Gallery

History
At the early stages of the project before the finalisation of station names, the Kota Damansara MRT station was referred to by the working name of PJU5 MRT Station. The switch to the name Kota Damansara caused some confusion as there was another station that had "Kota Damansara" as its working name, which was later given name Kwasa Damansara.

Bus Services

Feeder bus service
With the opening of the MRT Sungai Buloh-Kajang Line, feeder buses also began operating linking the station with several housing and industrial areas in Kota Damansara. The feeder buses operate from the station's feeder bus stops adjacent to the station.

Other buses

See also
MRT Kajang Line
Kota Damansara

References

External links
 Klang Valley Mass Rapid Transit website
 Unofficial information resource on the MRT

Rapid transit stations in Selangor
Sungai Buloh-Kajang Line
Railway stations opened in 2016